Fauna of Greece may refer to:
 List of birds of Greece
 List of mammals of Greece

See also
 Outline of Greece